Festuca burnatii is a species of grass in the family Poaceae. It is found in Spain.

References 

burnatii
Flora of Spain